Carolyn Leigh (August 21, 1926 – November 19, 1983) was an American lyricist for Broadway, film, and popular songs. She is best known as the writer with partner Cy Coleman of the pop standards "Witchcraft" and "The Best Is Yet to Come". With Johnny Richards, she wrote the million-seller "Young at Heart" for the film of the same name, starring Frank Sinatra.

Biography
Leigh was born to a Jewish family in the Bronx, New York, graduated from Hunter College High School, Queens College, and New York University.

Leigh worked as a copy writer for radio stations and advertising agencies. Always writing stories and poems, in 1951, when urged to write songs by a musical publisher who gave her a contract, she wrote "I'm Waiting Just for You" with Henry Glover, and two years later, "Young at Heart."

Leigh's lyrics for Broadway shows include Peter Pan, Wildcat, Little Me, and How Now, Dow Jones. The last was derived from an original idea of Leigh's, though Max Shulman wrote the script. She provided lyrics for the scores to the films The Cardinal in 1963 and Father Goose in 1964.  In 1969 she wrote the lyrics for the musical Gatsby, with the score by Lee Pockriss and the book by Hugh Wheeler.  
She also wrote the lyrics for two other unproduced musicals,Caesar’s Wife, again with music by Pockriss, about Julius Caesar's third wife, Calpurnia, and Juliet, based on the Fellini movie Juliet of the Spirits, with music by Morton Gould.

At the time of her death, Leigh was working with Marvin Hamlisch on the musical Smile. Leigh died on November 19, 1983, of a heart attack. She was divorced from David Cunningham Jr. She was inducted into the Songwriters Hall of Fame in 1985.

Tony Award nominations
 Little Me (1963) - Tony Award for Best Original Score
 How Now, Dow Jones (1968) - Tony Award for Best Original Score

References

External links
Bio on Songwriters Hall of Fame site

 Carolyn Leigh papers, 1944-1985, held by the Billy Rose Theatre Division, New York Public Library for the Performing Arts
 Carolyn Leigh scores, 1910-1982, held by the Music Division, New York Public Library for the Performing Arts

Jewish American songwriters
American musical theatre lyricists
Broadway composers and lyricists
New York University alumni
People from the Bronx
1926 births
1983 deaths
20th-century American musicians
Songwriters from New York (state)
20th-century American Jews